The Ontario Natural Law Party ran a number of candidates in the 1999 provincial election, none of whom were elected.  Information about these candidates may be found here.

Candidates
Brampton West—Mississauga: Mei Sze Viau
Broadview—Greenwood: Bob Hyman
Don Valley West: Debbie Weberg
Glengarry—Prescott—Russell: Mary Glasser
London—Fanshawe: Wanda Beaver
Nepean—Carleton: Brian Ernest Jackson
Peterborough: Robert Mayer
St. Catharines: Helene Anne Darisse
Sudbury: Bernard Fram
Trinity—Spadina: Ron Robins
Windsor—St. Clair: Janet Shorten
Windsor West: Lynn Tobin

Candidates in Ontario provincial elections
1999